This is a list of works written by the French composer Léo Delibes (1836–1891).

Operas and operettas 

See List of operas and operettas by Léo Delibes.

Other vocal music 

 La Marseillaise, arrangement for male voices (date unknown)
 Noël, for 3 voices
 Les prix, for 2 voices and accompaniment
 Messe brève, for two children's voices and organ
 C’est Dieu, for chorus
 En avant, for 3 voices
 Le dimanche, for 2 or 3 voices
 Les norvégiennes, for 2 female voices and accompaniment
 Les nymphes de bois, for 2 female voices and accompaniment
 La nuit de Noël, for 4 male voices, 1859
 Pastorale, for 4 male voices, 1865
 Alger, cantate, for soprano, chorus and orchestra, 1865
 Hymne de Noël, for chorus, 1865
 Les lansquenets, for 4 male voices, 1866
 Les chants lorrains, for 4 male voices, 1866
 Marche de soldats, for 4 male voices, 1866
 Avril, for chorus, 1866
 Au printemps, for 3 voices, 1867
 Chant de la paix, for 4 male voices, or 6 mixed voices, or 3 to 4 voices, 1867
 Trianon, for 4 male voices, 1868
 La cour des miracles, for 4 male voices, 1868
 Les filles de Cadix, for solo voice, 1874
 Les abeilles, for 3 voices, 1874
 Les pifferari, for 3 voices, 1874
 L’écheyeau de fil, for 3 voices, 1874
 Le pommier, for 3 voices, 1877
 La mort d’Orphée, lyrical scene for tenor and orchestra, 1877
 Voyage enfantin, for 3 voices, 1884
 Bonjour Suzon (Good Morning, Sue)

Ballets
La source, ou Naila in 3 acts, 1866
Coppélia, ou La fille aux yeux d’émail in 3 acts, 1870
Sylvia, ou La nymphe de Diane in 3 acts, 1876 (piano arrangement, 1876; orchestral suite, 1880)

Miscellaneous
La tradition prologue in verse form, 1864
Valse ou pas de fleurs for Adolphe Adam's Le corsaire (1867)
 Le roi s’amuse, six airs de danse dans le style ancien, dances, 1882 (piano arrangement 1882)

References
 Allmusic (2001). Leo Delibes Retrieved July 1, 2005.
 Classical Archives: Composer: Léo Delibes. Retrieved April 17, 2009.

Some of the information in this article is taken from the Dutch Wikipedia article.

 
Delibes